Kristopher Santos Da Graca (born 16 January 1998) is a Swedish footballer who plays as a centre back for Allsvenskan club IK Sirius.

Club career 
On 6 January 2021, Da Graca was transferred from Swedish side IFK Göteborg to Dutch club VVV-Venlo.

On 29 January 2022, Da Graca returned to Sweden and signed with IK Sirius.

International career
Da Graca was born in Sweden to parents from Cape Verde. He was a youth international for Sweden. In January 2020, he was selected for the Swedish national a-team's international training matches in Doha, Qatar against Moldavia and Kosovo by head coach, Janne Andersson. He is still eligible to represent Cape Verde due to his heritage.

He made his international debut for the Sweden national team on 12 January 2020 in a friendly game against Kosovo.

References

External links
 

1998 births
Living people
Footballers from Gothenburg
Swedish footballers
Sweden youth international footballers
Swedish people of Cape Verdean descent
Swedish sportspeople of African descent
Allsvenskan players
Eredivisie players
Eerste Divisie players
Hisingsbacka FC players
IFK Göteborg players
IK Sirius Fotboll players
VVV-Venlo players
Association football defenders
Swedish expatriate footballers
Expatriate footballers in the Netherlands
Swedish expatriate sportspeople in the Netherlands